The King's Minion or The Minion is a 1930 historical novel by the British-Italian writer Rafael Sabatini. It is based on the life of Robert Carr, 1st Earl of Somerset charting his dramatic rise as favourite of James I and rapid fall during the Overbury Affair.

References

Bibliography
  Henderson, Lesley & Kirkpatrick, Lesley D. L. Twentieth-century Romance and Historical Writers. St. James Press, 1990

1930 British novels
Novels by Rafael Sabatini
Novels set in the 17th century
Novels set in London
British historical novels
Hutchinson (publisher) books
Houghton Mifflin books
McClelland & Stewart books